The Augustus Garland House is a historic house at 1404 Scott Street in Little Rock, Arkansas.  It is a two-story wood-frame structure, with a truncated hip roof, weatherboard siding, and brick foundation.  It has an elaborately decorated two-story front porch, featuring bracketed square columns, low jigsawn balustrades, and a modillioned and dentillated cornice.  It was built in 1873 for Augustus Garland, a prominent local lawyer who served as Governor of Arkansas, United States Attorney General, and United States Senator.

The house was listed on the National Register of Historic Places in 1975.

See also
National Register of Historic Places listings in Little Rock, Arkansas

References

Houses on the National Register of Historic Places in Arkansas
Italianate architecture in Arkansas
Houses completed in 1873
Houses in Little Rock, Arkansas
National Register of Historic Places in Little Rock, Arkansas
Historic district contributing properties in Arkansas